Mary Benwell (1739–after 1800), married name Codd, was an English artist, a miniaturist and pastellist.

Life
Benell's teachers may have included John Russell or Catherine Read.

Benwell resided in Warwick Court, London, and exhibited crayon portraits and miniatures at the Incorporated Society of Artists and the Royal Academy between the years 1761 and 1791 and at The Society of Artists from 1762-1774. She worked also in oil colours and made a reputation in her profession, but she retired from it on her marriage about 1762 with a military officer named Codd (also Coode, Coade).

She was still living in Paddington in 1800.

Works

There is a portrait of Queen Charlotte of Mecklenburg-Strelitz, engraved after her by Richard Houston; and another of Miss Brockhurst, by J. Saunders. Other works were The Studious Fair (said to be a portrait of Queen Charlotte), engraved by Charles Spooner, and Cupid Disarmed, engraved by Charles Knight.

External links
Works by Mary Benwell can be found at the British Museum.

References

1739 births
19th-century deaths
18th-century English painters
18th-century English women artists
English portrait painters
English women painters
Painters from London
Portrait miniaturists
Pastel artists